Rajibpur Aftab Uddin High School is a girls and boys school, located in Ishwarganj Upazila of Mymensingh District, Bangladesh. It was established in 1930. It is a Bangla medium school.

Required courses for SSC examination

Language (compulsory)
 Bengali (paper I and II)
 English (paper I and II)

Mathematics
 Mathematics (compulsory)

Science courses (one is optional from the last two)
 Physics
 Chemistry
 Higher mathematics
 Biology

Business Studies courses
 Accounting
 Principles of business

Others (compulsory)
 Social science
 Religion (Islam or Hinduism)

School uniform
School uniform was introduced in 1990.
 Half sleeve green shirt
 Black color pants
 Black shoes

References

High schools in Bangladesh
Educational institutions established in 1930
1930 establishments in India